Alberto Joshimar Acosta Alvarado (born 26 February 1988) is a Mexican professional footballer who plays as a left-back for Liga MX club Juárez.

Club career 
Acosta was discovered while playing with Fútbol Soccer Manzanillo in the Segunda División de México and debuted with the first team in the Apertura 2010 Tournament. 
On October 20, 2012, Acosta scored his first hat-trick in the victory of 5–0 over Pumas UNAM.
Acosta returned with Tigres for the Apertura 2016.

Honours
Tigres UANL
Liga MX: Apertura 2011, Apertura 2016, Apertura 2017
Campeón de Campeones: 2016, 2017, 2018

References

External links
 

1988 births
Living people
Footballers from Tamaulipas
Association football wingers
Mexican footballers
Tigres UANL footballers
C.F. Pachuca players
Club Puebla players
Atlético Morelia players
FC Juárez footballers
Liga MX players
People from Ciudad Mante
Ascenso MX players